Coleophora ostryae is a moth of the family Coleophoridae found in North America, including Maryland and Ontario.

The larvae feed on the leaves of Ostrya, Carpinus, Carya, and Quercus species. They create a spatulate leaf case.

References

ostryae
Moths described in 1861
Moths of North America